Dennis "DJ" Sayre (born Dennis Sayre Jnr. 20 August 1986) is a former American professional darts player who currently plays in Professional Darts Corporation events.

Career
Sayre made his World Series of Darts debut at the 2017 US Darts Masters, where he lost to Daryl Gurney of Northern Ireland, and he played in the 2018 US Darts Masters, where he lost to Gary Anderson of Scotland.

References

External links

1986 births
Living people
American darts players
Professional Darts Corporation associate players
People from Chillicothe, Ohio